Darius Martin (born September 20, 1999)  is an American professional wrestler currently signed to All Elite Wrestling (AEW). He performs alongside his younger brother Dante Martin as part of the tag team Top Flight.

Professional wrestling career

Independent circuit (2016-2020) 
Darius Martin along with his brother Dante received his training from The Academy: School Of Professional Wrestling in Minnesota by Ken Anderson and they made their professional wrestling debut in 2016 as the tag team Top Flight.

Prior to AEW, Martin wrestled for Ireland’s Over the Top Wrestling, AAW Wrestling based in Illinois, Game Changer Wrestling, and Black Label Pro.

All Elite Wrestling (2020-present) 
On the October 27, 2020 episode of Dark, Top Flight made their All Elite Wrestling (AEW) debut where they lost to Evil Uno and Stu Grayson of The Dark Order. On the November 18 episode of Dynamite, Top Flight fought The Young Bucks in a losing effort. On November 23, it announced that they had signed with the company. In February 2021, Darius was sidelined with a torn ACL thus taking him out of action and leaving Dante on his own as a singles competitor.

On the March 2, 2022 episode of Dynamite, Darius made his return alongside his brother in the tag team Casino Battle Royal reuniting with his brother Dante, where he would last until the end being eliminated by Matt Jackson. The return to action was short-lived as it was revealed that Darius had gotten into a serious car accident, which was expected to leave him out injured for up to nine months. During this time, Dante once again continued as a singles competitor. Darius returned on the November 16, edition of Dynamite, teaming with Dante and AR Fox, to challenge Death Triangle, for the AEW World Trios Championships, in a losing effort. On the November 13 edition of Rampage, Top Flight unsuccessfully challenged FTR, for the ROH World Tag Team Championships. On December 10, at Final Battle, Top Flight made their debuts for AEW's sister company Ring of Honor, defeating The Kingdom on the pre-show. Darius competed in his first AEW singles match on the December 21 edition of Dynamite losing to Jon Moxley.  Following this on the December 23 edition of Rampage, Top Flight once again teamed with AR Fox, where they won the 300.000 Dollar Three Kings Christmas Casino Trios Battle Royal, where the brothers lastly eliminated ROH World Champion, Claudio Castagnoli. Due to this, Top Flight entered a short feud with the Blackpool Combat Club, in which Moxley and Castagnoli were members, losing to members of the group over the following weeks. Top Flight achieved their first win over the BBC on the January 16 edition of AEW Dark, defeating Castangnoli and Wheeler Yuta, in a 3-way tag-team match also involving, The Butcher and the Blade, after Dante pinned The Blade. On the January 18 edition of Dynamite, Top Flight defeated The Young Bucks, in an upset victory.

Championships and Accomplishments
All Elite Wrestling
Casino Trios Royale (2022 - with AR Fox and Dante Martin)
Canadian Wrestling Elite
CWE Canadian Unified Junior Heavyweight Championship (1 time)
Chikara
Rey de Voladores (2018)
F1RST Wrestling
F1RST Wrestling Wrestlepalooza Championship (1 time)
GALLI Lucha Libre
Copa Valadores (2019)
Glory Pro Resurgence
Glory Pro Resurgence Championship (1 time)
Glory Pro Wrestling
United Glory Tag Team Championship (1 time) - with Angel Dorado
Gateway to Glory Tournament (2018)
Heavy on Wrestling
HOW Undisputed Championship (2 times)
Independent Wrestling International
IWI Tag Team Championship (1 time) - with Angel Dorado
Pro Wrestling Battleground
PWB Battleground Championship (1 time)
PWB Breakout Championship (1 time)
Pro Wrestling Illustrated
Ranked No. 343 of the top 500 singles wrestlers in the PWI 500 in 2021

References 

1999 births
Living people
21st-century professional wrestlers
Place of birth missing (living people)
All Elite Wrestling personnel
American male professional wrestlers
Professional wrestlers from Minneapolis